Golam Mostofa is a Bangladesh Awami League politician and the incumbent Member of Parliament from Nilphamari-3.

Career
Mostofa was nominated by Bangladesh Awami League in 2008 for the Nilphamari-3. He lost the election to Jatiya Party candidate Kazi Faruque Kader, the son of Kazi Abdul Kader, former Minister of Pakistan. He was elected to Parliament from Nilphamari-3 as a candidate of Bangladesh Awami League on 5 January 2014.

References

Awami League politicians
Living people
10th Jatiya Sangsad members
Year of birth missing (living people)